Adolfo Rosinei Nascimento or simply Rosinei (born May 3, 1983, in Lavrinhas) is a Brazilian footballer who plays for Clube Atlético Juventus. He is known for winning the ball and possessing good ball control and passing range as he plays the ball forward.

Career 
Rosinei played for Corinthians till 2007 and won one Campeonato Brasileiro in 2005. He moved to Murcia in January 2008.
In July 2008, he was transferred to Internacional. In 2009, he was transferred to Club América on a one-year loan contract.  Finally on April 22, 2010, Club América officials announced that Rosinei's loan contract with America has now been converted to an official (Non-loan) 3 year expansion meaning that Rosinei was to remain with Club América permanently.

Honours
Corinthians
Campeonato Brasileiro Série A: 2005
Internacional
Copa Sudamericana: 2008
Campeonato Gaúcho: 2009

Atlético Mineiro
Campeonato Mineiro: 2013
Copa Libertadores: 2013

External links
 zerozero.pt
 Guardian Stats Centre
 Rosinei é apresentado no Beira-Rio

References

Brazilian footballers
Campeonato Brasileiro Série A players
Campeonato Brasileiro Série B players
La Liga players
Liga MX players
Campeonato Brasileiro Série C players
Expatriate footballers in Mexico
Expatriate footballers in Spain
Footballers from São Paulo
1983 births
Living people
Brazilian expatriate footballers
Brazilian people of Italian descent
Brazilian people of Irish descent
Association football midfielders
Associação Desportiva São Caetano players
Sport Club Corinthians Paulista players
Real Murcia players
Sport Club Internacional players
Club América footballers
Clube Atlético Mineiro players
Coritiba Foot Ball Club players
Paraná Clube players
Esporte Clube Tigres do Brasil players
Fortaleza Esporte Clube players